Colescott is a surname. Notable people with the surname include:

James A. Colescott (1897–1950), American Ku Klux Klan member
Robert Colescott (1925–2009), American painter
Warrington Colescott (1921–2018), American etcher